The Aero Adventure Aventura is a family of ultralight amphibians marketed as a kit aircraft by Aero Adventure of DeLand, Florida. The aircraft was designed by Bob Bailey in 1995.

The aircraft are high-wing flying boats of pusher configuration available in both single and two-seat models. Its design heritage stretches back to the Advanced Aeromarine Buccaneer amphibian ultralights.

Design
Introduced in 1995, the single-seat Aventura has repositionable main landing gear, down for runways and up for landing on water. The steerable tail wheel is retractable in concert with the repositioning of the main gear. There is no water rudder. The wing is an aluminium frame covered with pre-sewn Dacron envelopes. The hull is constructed from fibreglass and the wingtip floats are polyethylene. The remainder of the structure is anodized aluminium tubing, bolted together. Controls are conventional three-axis, with full span ailerons and no flaps. The company claims that the fast-build kit can be constructed in 90 hours.

The two-seat Aventura II was introduced in 1996 and is similar to the single seater, but with a wider cabin and hull for two occupants in side-by-side configuration. The two-seater also features flaps to reduce landing speeds. The company claims 130 hours to build the two-seater from the kit.

Variants
Aventura UL
Engines include the original  Rotax 277 in early models and the  Rotax 447 currently. 90 had been completed and flown by the end of 2011.
Aventura HP
Single seater intended to be registered as an amateur-built aircraft. Standard engines are the  Rotax 503  Rotax 582. 42 had been completed and flown by the end of 2011.
Aventura Sport
Two-seater marketed as the simplest and lightest model in the line-up. Standard engine is the  Rotax 582. 215 had been completed and flown by the end of 2011.
Aventura II
Two-seater with some options included as standard features. Standard engine is the  four-stroke Rotax 912ULS.
Aventura XLR
Limited edition two-seater with many extras as standard features, including a new style engine cowling, custom graphics package, redesigned instrument panel including GPS, vertical speed indicator and a mode-C transponder, electric landing gear retraction, gear indicator lights, differential hydraulic brakes, carpeting and a headliner. The standard engine is the  four-stroke Rotax 912ULS.
Aventura AVZ
Model with top-of-the-line equipment as standard.

Specifications (Aventura HP)

See also

References

External links

High-wing aircraft
Single-engined pusher aircraft
Homebuilt aircraft
Amphibious aircraft
1990s United States ultralight aircraft
Aventura
Flying boats